The Repertory of the Vienna Court Opera under Gustav Mahler is an account of the ten years during which Gustav Mahler held the office of director and when he directed the productions of more than 100 different operas, of which 33 had not previously been staged at the Hofoper and three were world premieres.  Another 55 were presented in either entirely new or substantially revised productions. In all, almost 3,000 performances took place at the Hofoper during Mahler's tenure, of which Mahler conducted more than 600.

Mahler, well known as a symphonic composer, joined the Vienna Court Opera (the Hofoper) in May 1897 as a staff conductor and director-designate, pending confirmation of his appointment as director. After his  confirmation in October 1897, he remained in the post until his resignation in November 1907.

Conducting duties were shared among staff conductors whose numbers included at various times Gustav Brecher, Johann Nepomuk Fuchs, Joseph Hellmesberger, Jr., Karl Luze, Hans Richter, Franz Schalk, Francesco Spetrino, Bruno Walter and Alexander Zemlinsky.

At the start of Mahler's tenure, stage designs were under the control of Anton Brioschi, the Hopfoper's official designer since 1886, and his assistant Heinrich Lefler. However, from 1903, new designs were increasingly the work of Alfred Roller, a member of the Secessionist group of artists into which circle Mahler had been introduced by his wife Alma. Roller was appointed to the Hofoper from June 1903; his innovative and experimental stage designs have been called "more remarkable than [Mahler's] additions to the repertoire".

Operas performed, 1897–1907

Performances of existing repertory works
The following operas were in the Hofoper repertory when Mahler assumed the directorship in 1897. Each had one or more revivals during the period of Mahler's tenure. Most of these older productions were significantly revised under Mahler; in some instances, entirely new productions of the works were mounted.  The list does not included ballets or other entertainments.

New works introduced to the Hofoper under Mahler
The following is a chronological list of the 33 new operas introduced to the Hofoper by Mahler.

See also

References
Notes

Sources

 

Gustav Mahler
Vienna State Opera
Opera-related lists